Jan Graubner (born 29 August 1948) is a Czech prelate of the Catholic Church who has been Archbishop of Prague since July 2022. He was Archbishop of Olomouc in the Czech Republic from 1992 to 2022, after serving as an auxiliary there for two years.

Biography
Jan Graubner was born in Brno in 29 August 1948. He graduated from high school in Strážnice in 1967 and then became an engineering worker in Považská Bystrica, then called Gottwald. In 1968 he was admitted to the Major Seminary of Olomouc. On 23 June 1973 he was ordained a priest for that archdiocese. From October 1973 to September 1975 he carried out his military service while also working as a chaplain in Zlín at the same time. From 1977 to 1982 he was chaplain in Valašské Klobouky. From 1982 to 1990 he was administrator of the Parish of Vizovice, with responsibility for the pilgrimage site of Provodov and the parish of Horní Lhota near Luhačovice.

On 17 March 1990 he was appointed titular bishop of Tagaria and auxiliary bishop of Olomouc. He received episcopal ordination on the 7 April. On 28 September 1992 he was promoted to Metropolitan Archbishop of Olomouc.

Since 1991 he has been president of Czech Catholic Charity. He was president of the Czech Episcopal Conference from 2000 to 2010 and was elected to another term in 2022. He has also been president of its Commission on Charity and delegate for the Missions.

In 2008, he received the Order of Tomáš Garrigue Masaryk from former President Václav Klaus for outstanding merits in the development of democracy and human rights.

In 2020, he contracted the Covid virus and came close to dying.

On 13 May 2022, Pope Francis appointed him Archbishop of Prague. He was installed there on 2 July. His appointment was surprising because he is so close to retirement age and he has never worked outside of Moravia.

Priestly sexual abuse
In 2000, a student at Palacký University of Olomouc Saints Cyril and Methodius Faculty of Theology filed criminal charges against both Graubner and one of his priests, František Merta. It accused Merta of sexual abuse of minors in the 1990s and Graubner of failing to report charges of abuse to the police, transferring him instead to another parish. A civil court found Merta guilty and he received a suspended sentence of two years in prison. Graubner has said he reassigned Merta because the case against him was inconclusive.

References

1948 births
Bishops of Olomouc
Catholic Church sexual abuse scandals in Europe
20th-century Roman Catholic archbishops in the Czech Republic.
21st-century Roman Catholic archbishops in the Czech Republic.
Czech people of German descent
Clergy from Brno
Living people
Recipients of the Order of Tomáš Garrigue Masaryk